Medicago italica is a species of in the family Fabaceae.

Sources

References 

Medicago
Flora of Malta